"Heroine" (literally Protagonist) is a song recorded by South Korean singer Sunmi. It was released on January 18, 2018, by Makeus Entertainment and The Black Label and distributed by LOEN Entertainment, with its music video premiering the same day.

Following the success of her third solo release "Gashina", which articulated a cynical attitude in the aftermath of a breakup, Sunmi conceptualized "Heroine" as a prequel narrative to it. She drew inspiration from the Adrian Lyne film 9½ Weeks (1986), expressing a "show must go on" sentiment as the protagonist deals with a turbulent relationship.

Background and release
On December 18, 2017, it was revealed that the singer was preparing for a comeback with the goal to release a new song in January 2018 with no further details. On January 2, an image teaser was released revealing the name as "Heroine" and the producer as The Black Label, marking her second collaboration with the YG-owned label after "Gashina". The release date was set to January 18 at 6 P.M. KST. A day after, a short clip was released titled as a "prequel" to the official music video. On January 3, a full schedule was released, revealing the dates for image and video teasers, starting on January 4.

The song was released on January 18, 2018, through several music portals, including MelOn in South Korea.

Composition
The song was written by Sunmi and Teddy Park, and produced by Teddy alongside 24. Musically, the song is noted for its Britpop and tropical house influences.

Music video
The first music video teaser was released on January 15, and shows the singer descending from a car to then show a close-up of her face. A second teaser titled "Scene #2" was released a day later, and shows the singer running and dancing at the same place as the first teaser. The official music video was released on January 18.

The music video was directed by the group Lumpens.

Commercial performance
The song debuted at number 6 on the Gaon Digital Chart, on the chart issue dating January 14–20, 2018, topping the componing Download Chart. In its second week, the song reach a new peak at number 2.

The song also debuted at number 3 on the US World Digital Song Sales with 2,000 downloads sold.

Controversy
There are concerns that the song has plagiarized Cheryl's debut solo single "Fight for This Love", which was released in 2009.
Sunmi's agency said that they were investigating the issue. It later concluded with stating, "We unequivocally reveal that ‘Heroine’ is 100 percent an original creative work with absolutely no reference to the song that has been named in the controversy."

Charts

Weekly charts

Year-end charts

Accolades

Awards and nominations

Music program awards

See also 
 List of M Countdown Chart winners (2018)

References

2018 singles
Songs written by Teddy Park
Songs written by Sunmi
2018 songs
Sunmi songs
Songs involved in plagiarism controversies
Kakao M singles
YG Entertainment singles
Music videos directed by Lumpens